Wade Dutton (born 23 September, 1986) is an Australian professional baseball utility for the Brisbane Bandits of the Australian Baseball League.

Career
Dutton played alongside his brother Brad Dutton in the Queensland Rams, debuting in the 2008 Claxton Shield before the inaugural Australian Baseball League season when they began playing for the Brisbane Bandits. Following the 2011–12 season, he was left off the roster, but continued playing in the Greater Brisbane League for Redcliffe Padres & Ipswich Musketeers.

He made it back on the team for the 2016–17 Australian Baseball League season and has continued to be a part of the team through 2019, being part of three of the four Bandits consecutive championships

Dutton was selected as a member of the Australia national baseball team for the 2019 WBSC Premier12.

References

External links

1986 births
Living people
Australian baseball players
Gulf Coast Tigers players
People from Brisbane
Sportsmen from Queensland
Brisbane Bandits players